Caroline of Hesse-Homburg (1819–1872), was a Princess consort of Reuss of Greiz by marriage to Henry XX, Prince Reuss of Greiz. She was the regent of the Principality of Reuss-Greiz during the minority of her minor son Heinrich XXII, Prince Reuss of Greiz, from 1859 until 1867.

Life
Caroline was eldest child of Gustav, Landgrave of Hesse-Homburg, and his wife, Princess Louise of Anhalt-Dessau.

On 1 October 1839 in Homburg vor der Höhe, she married Henry XX, Prince Reuss of Greiz. 

When her spouse died in 1859, she was made regent of the Principality during the minority of her son. When the Austro-Prussian War started in 1866, she chose the side of Austria, which was the reason to why the principality was occupied by Prussia and she was forced to resign.

Marriage and issue

She had five children:

 Princess Hermine Reuss of Greiz (25 December 1840 – 4 January 1890), married in 1862 to Prince Hugo of Schönburg-Waldenburg, had issue.
 Prince Heinrich XXI Reuss of Greiz (11 February 1844 – 14 June 1844)
 Heinrich XXII, Prince Reuss of Greiz (28 March 1846 – 19 April 1902)
 Prince Heinrich XXIII Reuss of Greiz (27 June 1848 – 22 October 1861)
 Princess Marie Reuss of Greiz (19 March 1855 – 31 December 1909), married in 1875 to Count Friedrich of Ysenburg and Büdingen in Meerholz (grandson of Ernst Casimir II, 2nd Prince of Ysenburg and Büdingen), no issue.

References
Friedrich Wilhelm Trebge: Spuren im Land. Aus der Geschichte des apanagierten thüringisch-vogtländischen Adelshauses Reuß-Köstritz. 2., ergänzte Auflage. Vogtländischer Altertumsforschender Verein zu Hohenleuben, Hohenleuben 2005.

1819 births
1872 deaths
19th-century women rulers
Princesses of Reuss
Daughters of monarchs